Live and Acoustic is a live album and the ninth overall album of the Filipino rock band, Rivermaya featuring Slapshock. This is a 2-disc album and has 22 tracks (13 audio tracks from Disc 1 and 9 music videos from Disc 2). The album has been released under Viva Records on January 28, 2003. This is the band's first live album filmed and recorded on May 18, 2002 from the "Double Trouble: Akoustik Rampage" concert at the Music Museum, Greenhills, San Juan. The bonus track "Basketbol" was performed at the Fort on December 8, 2001 to celebrate the 2nd Anniversary at Pulp Magazine also dubbed as "The Freakshow". The song was also included at the live album "Pulp: The Freakshow Album", released on 2002.

Track listing
All tracks' words and music by Rico Blanco, except where noted.

Personnel
Rico Blanco (lead vocals & keyboard)
Mark Escueta (drums, percussion & vocals)
Mike Elgar (guitar & vocals)
Japs Sergio (bass guitar)
Kakoy Legaspi (guitar)

Production
Executive producers: Vic del Rosario, Jr. and Vincent G. del Rosario
Produced by Rico Blanco
A&R: Rommel Sanchez
Photography: Patrick Dy, Miggy Matute, and Ross Capili
Art direction: Mark Escueta
Album cover design and layout: Mark Escueta

Reference

External links
Rivermaya: Live & Acoustic Video Playlist

Rivermaya albums
2002 live albums
2002 video albums
Live video albums